Caecum multicostatum is a species of minute sea snail, a marine gastropod mollusk or micromollusk in the family Caecidae.

Distribution
Caecum Multicostatum can be found in the Caribbean Sea,  Gulf of Mexico, and Venezuela

Description
The maximum recorded shell length is 4.2 mm.

Habitat
Minimum recorded depth is 2 m. Maximum recorded depth is 46 m.

References

External links

Caecidae
Gastropods described in 1867